Elbek Sultonov (born 31 December 1995) is a visually impaired Uzbekistani Paralympic track and field athlete, competing in throwing events: shot put and discus throw. He represented Uzbekistan at the 2020 Summer Paralympics.

Career
Sultonov represented Uzbekistan in the men's shot put F12 event at the 2020 Summer Paralympics and won a bronze medal.

References

1995 births
Living people
Paralympic athletes of Uzbekistan
Uzbekistani male discus throwers
Uzbekistani male shot putters
Medalists at the World Para Athletics Championships
Athletes (track and field) at the 2020 Summer Paralympics
Medalists at the 2020 Summer Paralympics
Paralympic medalists in athletics (track and field)
Paralympic bronze medalists for Uzbekistan
People from Navoiy Region
Visually impaired shot putters
Visually impaired discus throwers
Paralympic shot putters
Medalists at the 2018 Asian Para Games
21st-century Uzbekistani people